The men's decathlon event at the 1928 Olympic Games took place between August 4 & August 5.

Results

100 metres

Long jump

Shot put

High jump

400 metres

110 metre hurdles

Discus throw

Pole vault

Javelin throw

1500 metres

Final standings

Key:  DNF = Did not finish, OR = Olympic record

References

Men's decathlon
1928
Men's events at the 1928 Summer Olympics